William Spencer Leveson-Gower, 4th Earl Granville,  (11 July 1880 – 25 June 1953), styled The Honourable William Leveson-Gower until 1939, was a British naval commander and governor from the Leveson-Gower family.

Background
Leveson-Gower was the younger son of Granville Leveson-Gower, 2nd Earl Granville, by his second wife Castilia Rosalind Campbell (daughter of Walter Frederick Campbell).

Career
After Wixenford School, William Leveson-Gower joined the Royal Navy in 1894. He was promoted to Sub Lieutenant in 1900, and lieutenant on 26 June 1902, when he was re-appointed to the torpedo cruiser HMS Scout. In August 1902 he was posted to HMS Hood, serving with the Mediterranean Fleet.

Promotion to commander followed in 1913. He served in the First World War and was awarded the Distinguished Service Order in 1919.

He was appointed Chief of Staff to the Commander-in-Chief, The Nore in 1924, aide-de-camp to the King in 1929 and Commander-in-Chief, Coast of Scotland in 1931. He was made a Companion of the Bath in 1930 and retired in 1935.

Leveson-Gower became Lieutenant Governor of the Isle of Man in 1937. He set up the War Consultative Committee in November 1939 to act as a 'war cabinet' during World War II. The committee consisted of members of the House of Keys and the Legislative Council of the Isle of Man.

In 1939 he succeeded his elder brother in the earldom. Granville was appointed a Knight Commander of the Royal Victorian Order (KCVO) in 1945 and became Governor of Northern Ireland in 1945, serving until 1952. He was made a Knight of the Garter that same year.

Family
In 1916, Lord Granville married Lady Rose Bowes-Lyon, the second surviving daughter of the 14th Earl of Strathmore and Kinghorne, and elder sister of Queen Elizabeth the Queen Mother. They had two children, five grandchildren and ten great-grandchildren:

Lady Mary Cecilia Leveson-Gower (12 December 1917 – 13 February 2014), who married Sir Samuel Clayton (8 January 1918 – February 2004) on 7 July 1956. They had two children and one grandson:
Gilbert Falkingham Clayton (4 September 1958), who married Rosalind Mullen in 1994. They have one son: 
Samuel Wittewronge Kit Clayton (February 2002) 
Rose Cecilia Clayton (25 January 1960), who married William Wordie Stancer on 9 July 1993. They have one son, Jamie Wordie,"Jock" (4 June 2001)
Granville James Leveson-Gower, 5th Earl Granville (6 December 1918 – 31 October 1996), who married Doon Aileen Plunket (1931–2003) on 9 October 1958. They had three children and nine grandchildren:
Granville George Fergus Leveson-Gower, 6th Earl Granville (10 September 1959), who married Anne Topping on 23 May 1997. They have three children:
Lady Rose Alice Leveson-Gower (16 April 1998)
George James Leveson-Gower, Lord Leveson (22 July 1999)
Lady Violet May Leveson-Gower (5 August 2002)
Lady Marcia Rose Aileen Leveson-Gower (10 February 1961 – 3 August 2005), who married Jonathan Charles Bulmer in 1986. They had four children:
Hesper Rose Constance Bulmer (1990)
James Alexander Howard Bulmer (1992)
Hector Charles Marcus Bulmer (1993)
Lara Bulmer (29 August 1995)
Hon. Niall James Leveson-Gower (24 August 1963), who married Amanda Blaxell in 1996. They have one set of twins:
Charlie Leveson-Gower (14 February 2000)
Honor Leveson-Gower (14 February 2000)

Lord Granville died in June 1953, aged 72. He was cremated at Golders Green Crematorium. The Countess Granville died in 1967.

References

External links

1880 births
1953 deaths
Earls Granville
Knights of the Garter
Knights Grand Cross of the Royal Victorian Order
Companions of the Order of the Bath
Companions of the Distinguished Service Order
Royal Navy officers
William Leveson-Gower, 4th Earl Granville
Royal Navy officers of World War I
Lieutenant Governors of the Isle of Man
People educated at Wixenford School